A freight terminal is a processing node for freight. They may include airports, seaports, container ports, goods stations, railroad terminals and trucking terminals. As most freight terminals are located at ports, many cargo containers can be seen around the area.

See also
 Cargo Airline
 Railroad terminal
 Trucking

Freight transport
Air cargo terminals